Östen is a masculine given name. It is a variant of Øystein and is mostly used in Sweden. Notable people with the name are as follows:

 Östen Bergstrand (1873–1948), Swedish astronomer
 Östen Dahl (born 1945), Swedish linguist
 Östen Edlund (born 1934), Swedish discus thrower
 Östen Elfving (1874–1936), Finnish agricultural expert and politician
 Östen Eriksson (born 1958), Swedish musical artist
 Östen Mäkitalo (1938–2011), Swedish electrical engineer
 Östen Sandström (1910–1994), Swedish sprinter
 Östen Sjöstrand (1925–2006), Swedish poet
 Osten Taylor, American reality show contestant
 Östen Undén (1886–1974), Swedish academic and politician
 Östen Warnerbring (1934–2006), Swedish musical artist

References

Swedish masculine given names